Montréal/Les Cèdres Airport  was a general aviation aerodrome located approximately  west of Montreal, Quebec, Canada near Autoroute 20 west of Vaudreuil-Dorion. The aerodrome was owned and operated by Laurentide Aviation. The aerodrome closed in spring 2022 to allow for commercial development.

See also
 List of airports in the Montreal area

References

External links
 Laurentide Aviation - airport operator

Registered aerodromes in Montérégie